Branisko may be:

 Branisko (mountain range), a mountain range in eastern Slovakia between Spiš and Šariš regions.
 Branisko (hill), a mountain pass and hill.
 Branisko Tunnel, a motorway tunnel opened in 2003
 11.5 km long creek in the Spiš region